The Idol of Paris is a 1914 British silent drama film directed by Maurice Elvey and starring Elisabeth Risdon, Fred Groves and A. V. Bramble. The film was based on a play of the same title by Charles Darrell.

Cast
 Elisabeth Risdon as Flare-Flare  
 Fred Groves as Philippe Castelle  
 A. V. Bramble as Prince Serbius 
 Gordon Dennis as Victor Sancterre  
 Constance Walton as Madame

References

Bibliography
 Goble, Alan. The Complete Index to Literary Sources in Film. Walter de Gruyter, 1999.
 Murphy, Robert. Directors in British and Irish Cinema: A Reference Companion. British Film Institute, 2006.

External links
 

1914 films
British drama films
British silent feature films
1910s English-language films
Films directed by Maurice Elvey
1914 drama films
British films based on plays
Films set in Paris
British black-and-white films
1910s British films
Silent drama films